Femme is an abandoned community in Newfoundland and Labrador.

Ghost towns in Newfoundland and Labrador